Chris Bourne (born 6 September 1985) is an English football player of Guyanese descent who plays for Harlow Town.

Club career
Bourne started his football career at the age of 12, as a goalkeeper in his school team before moving out on pitch.

He plays as a left-sided defender or midfielder. He has played for non-League teams, Canvey Island, Billericay Town, Welling United, Brentwood Town, Heybridge Swifts and Croydon Athletic.

International career
He made his international debut for Guyana against Cuba at MacKenzie Sports Club Ground, Linden on 22 January 2008. His second cap came two days later, against Cuba at Georgetown Cricket Club Ground, Georgetown.

International goals

Personal life 
His father, Gary, is also a footballer, having previously played for Millwall. Bourne also manages an amateur Sunday league football side, FC Gulls.

References

External links
Chris Bourne profile at Caribbean Football Database

1985 births
Living people
Guyanese footballers
English footballers
Guyana international footballers
Canvey Island F.C. players
Billericay Town F.C. players
Welling United F.C. players
Brentwood Town F.C. players
Heybridge Swifts F.C. players
Staines Town F.C. players
Croydon Athletic F.C. players
Metropolitan Police F.C. players
Hornchurch F.C. players
Aveley F.C. players
Grays Athletic F.C. players
Concord Rangers F.C. players
East Thurrock United F.C. players
Hadley F.C. players
Harlow Town F.C. players
Isthmian League players
Association football midfielders
English people of Guyanese descent